Trijn Rembrands (1557–1638) is known as the heroine of the Spanish Siege of Alkmaar during the Eighty Years' War in 1573, when she allegedly served in the defence as a soldier. 

She was married to the textile merchant Cornelis Reyersz. In 1661 described as an example of both men and women fighting with equal bravery during the war: public memorial ceremonies were held for her in 1777 and 1865, and she is the subject of an opera, Alkmaar Trijn.

References
 inghist.nl

1638 deaths
1557 births
16th-century Dutch people
Women in 16th-century warfare
Dutch people of the Eighty Years' War
People from Alkmaar
Women in war in the Netherlands